Archer is the given name of:

 Archer Alexander (c. 1810–1879), former black slave who served as the model for the slave in the statue variously known as Freedom Memorial and the Emancipation Memorial in Lincoln Park, Washington, DC
 Archer Baldwin (1883–1966), British Member of Parliament
 Archer Blood (1923–2004), American diplomat in Bangladesh
 Sir Archer Croft, 2nd Baronet (1683–1753), Member of Parliament
 Archer T. Gammon (1918–1945), US Army soldier and posthumous recipient of the Medal of Honor
 Archer Thompson Gurney (1820–1887), Church of England clergyman and hymn writer
 Archer Butler Hulbert (1873–1933), historical geographer, writer, professor of American history and newspaper editor
 Archer Milton Huntington (1870–1955), American historian and philanthropist
 Archer King (1917–2012), American theatrical agent, producer and actor
 Archer Maclean (1962–2022), British video game programmer
 Archer MacMackin (1888–1961), American silent film director, producer and screenwriter
 Archer Martin (1910–2002), British chemist and Nobel laureate
 Archer Mathews (1744–1796), American pioneer and politician
 Archer James Oliver (1774–1842), British painter
 Archer Allen Phlegar (1846–1912), Virginia State Senator and Virginia Supreme Court justice
 Archer Prewitt (born 1963), American musician and cartoonist

Fictional characters
 Archer, the half brother of Robin revealed in the last episodes of Robin Hood

 Archer Sterling, star of FX animation Archer

See also
 Archer (surname)